The Americas Zone was one of the three zones of the regional Davis Cup competition in 1993.

In the Americas Zone there were three different tiers, called groups, in which teams competed against each other to advance to the upper tier. Winners in Group I advanced to the World Group Qualifying Round, along with losing teams from the World Group first round. Teams who lost in the first round competed in the relegation play-offs, with the winning team remaining in Group I, whereas the losing team was relegated to the Americas Zone Group II in 1994.

Participating nations

Draw

  and  advance to World Group Qualifying Round.

  relegated to Group II in 1994.

First round

Chile vs. Bahamas

Mexico vs. Canada

Second round

Bahamas vs. Uruguay

Argentina vs. Mexico

Relegation play-off

Chile vs. Canada

References

External links
Davis Cup official website

Davis Cup Americas Zone
Americas Zone Group I